Róbson Carlos Duarte (born 20 June 1993), commonly known as Róbson, is a Brazilian footballer who plays as a forward for Chungnam Asan.

Career statistics

Club

Notes

References

1993 births
Living people
Brazilian footballers
Association football forwards
Brazilian expatriate footballers
América Futebol Clube (SP) players
Grêmio Catanduvense de Futebol players
Clube Atlético Sorocaba players
Associação Desportiva São Caetano players
União Recreativa dos Trabalhadores players
Esporte Clube Santo André players
Esporte Clube Água Santa players
Associação Atlética Anapolina players
Goiás Esporte Clube players
Gwangju FC players
Seoul E-Land FC players
Ansan Greeners FC players
Chungnam Asan FC players
Campeonato Brasileiro Série B players
K League 2 players
Brazilian expatriate sportspeople in South Korea
Expatriate footballers in South Korea
Sportspeople from Londrina